The 2017 Chengdu Open was a men's tennis tournament played on outdoor hard courts. It was the 2nd edition of the Chengdu Open and part of the ATP World Tour 250 series of the 2017 ATP World Tour. It took place at the Sichuan International Tennis Center in Chengdu, China, from September 25 to October 1.

Singles main-draw entrants

Seeds

1 Rankings are as of September 18, 2017

Other entrants
The following players received wildcards into the singles main draw:
  Wu Di
  Wu Yibing
  Mikael Ymer

The following player received entry as a special exempt:
  Peter Gojowczyk

The following players received entry from the qualifying draw:
  Taylor Fritz
  Adrián Menéndez Maceiras
  Mate Pavić
  Stefanos Tsitsipas

Withdrawals
Before the tournament
  Adrian Mannarino →replaced by  Dušan Lajović
  Jo-Wilfried Tsonga →replaced by  Thiago Monteiro
  Fernando Verdasco →replaced by  Bernard Tomic

Retirements
  Mate Pavić

Doubles main-draw entrants

Seeds

1 Rankings are as of September 18, 2017

Other entrants
The following pairs received wildcards into the doubles main draw:
  Sun Fajing /   Te Rigele
  Wu Di /  Wu Yibing

Champions

Singles 

  Denis Istomin def.  Marcos Baghdatis, 3–2 ret.

Doubles 

  Jonathan Erlich /  Aisam-ul-Haq Qureshi def.  Marcus Daniell /  Marcelo Demoliner, 6–3, 7–6(7–3)

External links 
Official website 

2017
2017 ATP World Tour
2017 in Chinese tennis
September 2017 sports events in China
October 2017 sports events in China